The Citgo Six is the name by which six senior executives of Citgo, detained in Venezuela, are known. Citgo is a subsidiary of the state-owned oil company Petróleos de Venezuela (PDVSA).

Overview 
The executives were arrested on November 21, 2017 and accused of signing an agreement that was "unfavorable" for the Venezuelan subsidiary. 

The executives have denied the charges against them and have stated that they are victims of a political move by the Venezuelan Maduro-led government to pressure the United States government. They were granted house arrest in December 2019, but were sent back to jail on the same day that President Donald Trump received Juan Guaidó (Maduro's opponent in the Venezuelan presidential crisis) at the White House. On November 26, 2020 the executives were sentenced on corruption-related charges. 

On April 30, 2021 they were issued a measure of house arrest, but were transferred to El Helicoide after the extradition of Maduro-linked Colombian businessman Alex Saab in 2021, who was facing federal money laundering charges in the United States. The US government demanded the immediate release of the executives.

On March 9, 2022, one of the Citgo Six was released following a meeting between US officials, including US Ambassador to Venezuela James B. Story, and Venezuelan President Nicolás Maduro. 

The families of the five remaining executives were a part of the Bring Our Families Home campaign which advocates to bring home wrongful detainees and hostages. Their images are featured in a 15-foot mural in Georgetown (Washington, D.C.) along with other Americans wrongfully detained abroad.

On October 1, 2022 the remaining five members of the Citgo Six were released following a prisoner exchange.

See also 
 Narcosobrinos affair
 Matthew John Heath
 United States–Venezuela relations

References

External links 

 EXCLUSIVE Venezuelan ministers were informed of deal 'Citgo Six' were jailed for, documents show - Reuters, 17 March 2021
American prisoners and detainees
United States–Venezuela relations
Prisoners and detainees of Venezuela
PDVSA